U.S. Route 75 (US-75) is a north–south U.S. Highway stretching from Kittson County, Minnesota to Dallas, Texas. In Kansas, the highway runs from south to north through the eastern part of the state. It enters the state from Oklahoma near Caney and runs north, serving the state capitol of Topeka. The highway continues north of Topeka, passing by the Potawatomi and Kickapoo Indian reservation, and passes over the Nebraska state line near Sabetha.

Route description
US-75 enters Kansas from Oklahoma near Caney and almost immediately starts an overlap with US-166. The highways split about 4 miles north of the state line. South of Neodesha, US-75 overlaps with US-400 as a 2 lane freeway.

At Interstate 35 (I-35), US-75 becomes a two-lane expressway again, passing east of Melvern Lake. About 15 miles south of Topeka, the highway becomes a four lane freeway. US-75 crosses the Kansas Turnpike without any direct access and drivers must use I-470 to access the turnpike. US 75 runs around the main part of the city along I-470 and I-70.

Leaving Topeka, US-75 becomes its own route again. Between Hoyt and Holton, the highway runs along the eastern border of the Potawatomi Indian Reservation. A few miles to the north, the highway runs west of the Kickapoo Reservation. North of Sabetha, US-75 exits the state into Nebraska.

History
The junction with K-268 and K-31 was formally a four-way intersection. From January 2004 to August 2009, there was a total of 24 crashes, which included one fatality and fifteen that resulted in injuries. Residents of the surrounding communities requested a "safer type of intersection", then in late Fall of 2013, work began to reconstruct the intersection as a roundabout. On November 17, 2014, the new roundabout at the eastern terminus opened to unrestricted traffic. The project was fully completed by the end of December. Smoky Hill LLC from Salina, was the primary contractor on the $2.541 million roundabout project. On August 9, 2018, a tractor-trailer travelling southbound on US-75 crashed into the roundabout. The trucks fuel tank was damaged and spilled about 70 gallons of diesel fuel. K-31 and US-75 traffic was reduced to one lane for about four hours after the crash.

Junction list

References

External links

75
 Kansas
Transportation in Montgomery County, Kansas
Transportation in Wilson County, Kansas
Transportation in Woodson County, Kansas
Transportation in Coffey County, Kansas
Transportation in Osage County, Kansas
Transportation in Shawnee County, Kansas
Transportation in Jackson County, Kansas
Transportation in Brown County, Kansas
Transportation in Nemaha County, Kansas